The 2007 PapaJohns.com Bowl was a postseason college football match between the Southern Miss Golden Eagles and the Cincinnati Bearcats at Legion Field in Birmingham, Alabama. The University of Southern Mississippi represented Conference USA (which Cincinnati was once a member of) and the University of Cincinnati represented the Big East Conference. The game  resulted in a 31–21 Cincinnati victory, which did not cover their 11-point spread. The payout for both teams was $300,000, the lowest payout among all college football bowl games.

This was the final game for head coach Jeff Bower, ending his 17-season tenure at Southern Miss. Bower was forced to resign after their disappointing season. After Bower's resignation, the selection of Southern Miss was notable as Bower's first game as head coach of the Golden Eagles was also at Legion Field, in the All-American Bowl in 1990.

Cincinnati quarterback Ben Mauk passed for four touchdowns and 334 yards. Southern Miss quarterback Jeremy Young went 18-for-32 for 122 yards with two touchdowns and three interceptions. After being down 31-14 in the fourth, quarter Jeremy Young cut the lead by scoring a 5-yard touchdown pass to Chris Johnson, but Southern Miss' rally fell short after they couldn't recover an onside kick or convert a fourth-and-1 play on its next possession. Only 35,258 people attended the game, less than half of Legion Field's capacity. Cincinnati distributed 8,352 tickets, a school record for bowl attendance, while Southern Mississippi distributed around 5,000 tickets. Cincinnati's win brought their record to 10-3, their first 10-win season since 1951. With the loss Southern Miss' record ended at 7-5.

Game summary

Final statistics

* Completions/Attempts
a Carries
b Long play
c Receptions

References

PapaJohns.com Bowl
Birmingham Bowl
Southern Miss Golden Eagles football bowl games
Cincinnati Bearcats football bowl games
PapaJohns.com Bowl
2007 in sports in Alabama